Tibetan tea is a post-fermented tea that originated in Yaan.  It has been long been traded as a tea brick between China and Tibet. The tea is packed in Kangting and shipped over the caravan routes by yak.

The writer Keith Souter called Tibeti "a famous Tibetan tea, which can be made into tea bricks". In 1842, Godfrey Vigne wrote of Tibeti, "When well made, it resembles chocolate in appearance, in consequence of the reddish tinge imparted to the tea by the presence of the soda, which prevents it also from cloying."

References

Further reading
 
 
 
 
 
 

Fermented tea